Leonard Radowski (born 4 August 1952) is a former professional footballer who played as a forward. Radowski started his career playing in Gdańsk with MRKS Gdańsk. In 1974 aged 22 Radowski joined II liga side Lechia Gdańsk. He made his Lechia debut on 18 August 1974 playing in a 3–0 win against Bałtyk Gdynia. Radowski spent 6 seasons with Lechia, during this time he made 137 appearances and scored 28 goals in all competitions. In 1980 Radowski joined Olimpia Elbląg, and it is known that he was part of the Olimpia squad that won the 1980–81 III liga (group II), and being one of the few Olimpia squads to play in the Polish second division. It is unknown how long Radowski spent with Olimpia or at which point he retired from playing football.

Honours

Olimpia Elbląg
III liga (group II): 1980–81

References

1952 births
Living people
Polish footballers
Lechia Gdańsk players
Olimpia Elbląg players
Association football forwards